USS Billings (LCS-15) is a  littoral combat ship of the United States Navy. She is the first ship in naval service named after Billings, Montana.

Design 
In 2002, the U.S. Navy initiated a program to develop the first of a fleet of littoral combat ships. The Navy initially ordered two monohull ships from Lockheed Martin, which became known as the Freedom-class littoral combat ships after the first ship of the class, . Odd-numbered U.S. Navy littoral combat ships are built using the Freedom-class monohull design, while even-numbered ships are based on a competing design, the trimaran hull  from General Dynamics. The initial order of littoral combat ships involved a total of four ships, including two of the Freedom-class design.  Billings is the eighth Freedom-class littoral combat ship to be built.

Billings includes additional stability improvements over the original Freedom design; the stern transom was lengthened and buoyancy tanks were added to the stern to increase weight service and enhance stability. The ship will also feature automated sensors to allow "conditions-based maintenance" and reduce crew overwork and fatigue issues that Freedom had on her first deployment.

Construction and career 
Marinette Marine was awarded the contract to build the ship on 4 March 2013. Construction began on 20 October 2014 and she was launched on 1 July 2017. she is homeported to Naval Station Mayport, Florida and assigned to Littoral Combat Ship Squadron Two. In June 2019, Billings visited Cleveland, Ohio. Billings sustained damage after hitting Rosaire Desgagnes, a bulk cargo ship in Montreal, Quebec, Canada. The incident occurred on 24 June 2019. The vessel's starboard bridge wing was damaged as a result of the collision. Billings was officially commissioned in Key West, Florida on 3 August 2019.

On the 4 July 2021, a contingent of her crew visited their ship’s namesake city to celebrate Independence Day. Later on the 10th of the same month, the ship together with the Dominican Republic Navy conducted a passing exercise (PASSEX). 24 August, Billings and Burlington were dispatched to support and provide relief to Haiti after a 7.2-magnitute earthquake that struck Haiti on 14 August.

Gallery

References

 

 

Freedom-class littoral combat ships
2017 ships
Ships built by Marinette Marine